Physalis crassifolia is a species of flowering plant in the nightshade family known by the common names yellow nightshade groundcherry and thick-leaf ground-cherry. It is native to the southwestern United States and northern Mexico, where it can be found in rocky, dry desert and mountain habitat. This is a perennial herb producing a ridged, angular, branching stem approaching 80 cm long, taking a clumped, matted, or erect form. The fleshy oval leaves are 1 to 3 cm long and have smooth, wavy, or bluntly toothed edges. The herbage is glandular and coated in short hairs. The yellow flowers growing from the leaf axils are widely bell-shaped, vaguely five-lobed, and around 2 cm wide. The star-shaped calyx of sepals at the base of the flower enlarges as the fruit develops, becoming an inflated, angled lanternlike structure about 2 cm long, which contains the berry.

References

External links
Physalis crassifolia. The Jepson Manual eFlora 2012.
CalPhotos

crassifolia
Flora of the Southwestern United States
Flora of Mexico